Salvation Sect from the Korean word for "salvation", guwon, may refer to any of the following sects:
 Evangelical Baptist Church of Korea, known as the Evangelical Layman's Church before 1981
 Good News Mission
 Life Word Mission

Christian new religious movements